George Mackie (born 18 May 1954) is a Scottish former professional footballer who played as a defender and midfielder.

Career
Born in Edinburgh, Mackie began his career at Salvesen B.C., before playing in the Scottish Football League for Dundee, Partick Thistle, Albion Rovers, Brechin City and Arbroath.

He also played in Denmark for B 1909.

References

1954 births
Living people
Scottish footballers
Dundee F.C. players
Partick Thistle F.C. players
Albion Rovers F.C. players
Brechin City F.C. players
Arbroath F.C. players
Scottish Football League players
Scottish football managers
Arbroath F.C. managers
Scottish Football League managers
Scottish expatriate footballers
Expatriate men's footballers in Denmark
Footballers from Edinburgh
Association football defenders
Association football midfielders